Bollig is a surname. Notable people with the surname include:

Ben Bollig, British academic
Brandon Bollig (born 1987), American ice hockey player
Johann Bollig (1821–1895), German theologian and papal advisor